Tape Wrangler is a duct tape dispenser produced by Stexley-Brake, LLC.  The tape gun is designed to dispense straight and smooth pieces of tape, working in the same way as tape dispensers do for pressure-sensitive tape.  The product was launched in 2008.

References

Packaging machinery
Products introduced in 2008